Artur Valeryevich Dilman (born August 29, 1990) is a Kazakh swimmer, who specialized in freestyle and individual medley events. He represented his nation Kazakhstan at the 2008 Summer Olympics, and has won a career total of six medals (two in each color) in a major international competition, spanning both the indoor and outdoor Asian Games. Dilman also spent his college sports career in the United States as a member of the Drury Panthers swimming and diving team under head coach Brian Reynolds, while pursuing his sports management studies at Drury University in Springfield, Missouri.

Dilman competed for the Kazakh swimming squad in the men's 200 m freestyle at the 2008 Summer Olympics in Beijing. Leading up to the Games, he snatched the top spot with a 1:52.42 to clear the invincible FINA B-cut (1:52.53) by 0.11 of a second at the Kazakhstan Open Championships in Almaty. Swimming in heat two, Dilman tried to hold on with Singapore's Bryan Tay and Estonia's Vladimir Sidorkin heading into the 150-metre turn for the top three spots, but faded down the final stretch to finish with a fifth-place time in 1:52.90. Dilman failed to advance into the semifinals, as he placed fifty-second overall out of fifty-eight swimmers in the prelims.

On June 17, 2012, Dilman ordered a six-month suspension by the Kazakhstan Swimming Federation, after he was tested positive for a banned substance methylhexaneamine, following an in-competition doping test at the ENKA Open in Istanbul. On March 13, 2013, Dilman helped out his college team Drury Panthers to claim their ninth consecutive title in the men's freestyle relay at the NCAA Division II Swimming Championships.

References

External links
Profile – Kazakhstan Swimming Federation
Player Bio – Drury Panthers
NBC Olympics Profile

1990 births
Living people
Kazakhstani male medley swimmers
Olympic swimmers of Kazakhstan
Swimmers at the 2008 Summer Olympics
Swimmers at the 2010 Asian Games
Asian Games medalists in swimming
Kazakhstani male freestyle swimmers
Sportspeople from Almaty
Drury Panthers men's swimmers
Asian Games bronze medalists for Kazakhstan

Medalists at the 2010 Asian Games
21st-century Kazakhstani people